The 2011 Mubadala World Tennis Championship was a non-ATP affiliated exhibition tournament. The world's top players competed in the knock-out event, which has prize money of $250,000 to the winner. The event was held at the Abu Dhabi International Tennis Complex at the Zayed Sports City in Abu Dhabi, United Arab Emirates. It was a warm-up event for the season, with the ATP World Tour beginning on January 4, 2011.

Players
 Rafael Nadal ATP No. 1
 Roger Federer ATP No. 2
 Robin Söderling ATP No. 5
 Tomáš Berdych ATP No. 6
 Jo-Wilfried Tsonga ATP No. 13
 Marcos Baghdatis ATP No. 20

Results

 It was Nadal's 2nd win at the event, also winning in 2010. It made him the most successful player at the event, with two titles.

External links
Official website

World Tennis Championship
Capitala World Tennis Championship
2011 (1)
December 2010 sports events in Asia
January 2011 sports events in Asia